Bucov is a commune in Prahova County, Muntenia, Romania, just east of Ploiești, the county seat. It is composed of five villages: Bighilin, Bucov, Chițorani, Pleașa and Valea Orlei.

The commune is located in the south-central part of the county. It is traversed by the DN1B road, which runs from Ploiești to Buzău. 

The river Teleajen flows through the commune north to south, separating it from Ploiești. The Bucovel is a left tributary of the Teleajen; it discharges into the Iazul Morilor Teleajen in Bucov.

The Battle of Bucov (also: Bukowo) was fought here in 1600.

References

Communes in Prahova County
Localities in Muntenia
Place names of Slavic origin in Romania